Reuben Bosworth (ca.1797 – 26 July 1883) was a watch and clockmaker in Nottingham.

Life

He was born around 1797 in Smisby, Derbyshire. He married late in life in 1856 to Sarah.

He was a watchmaker and clockmaker in Nottingham. He was apprenticed John Whitehurst in Derby, and then moved to Nottingham and succeeded William Hall, taking over his duties in regulating and winding the Nottingham Town Hall clock in 1833. In the financial year 1 September 1842 to 1 September 1843 it was reported that he received the annual salary of £18 18s. 0d (equivalent to £ in ) for winding up and regulating the Exchange and Town-hall clocks. In 1842 he was employed by the Leicester corporation to illuminate the Exchange clock at Leicester with a single plate of glass, which would be the largest in the East Midlands.

In the Nottingham Review of 15 March 1844, an article appeared praising his work. The Exchange Clock. We beg to draw the attention of our readers to the superior performance of this time keeper. The clock was made by Mr. Reuben Bosworth….and to such great accuracy has Mr. Bosworth regulated its rate of going, that, from the second of November last to the present time [March 1844] a period of four months, it has not varied half a minute.

He made turret clocks, some of which are still found in Nottinghamshire and Derbyshire, wall clocks which he sold to the Midland Railway which were used in railway offices and signal boxes, and longcase clocks and watches.

It is suggested that some of his turret clock business was taken over in 1845 by G. & F. Cope.

He died on 26 July 1883 leaving £7,861 3s 9d.  (equivalent to £ in ) to his wife.

Works

He produced turret clocks for the following buildings:
Nottingham Exchange 1837
St. Stephen's Church, Sneinton, 1839
Priory Church of St. Peter, Thurgarton
St Peter's Church, Nottingham 1847 
St Swithun's Church, Woodborough, 1856
All Saints' Church, Cotgrave 1865
Bonsall Church, Derbyshire 1865
St. Mary's Church, Arnold, 1867
St Mary and All Saints' Church, Hawksworth ca. 1867
All Saints' Church, Collingham, 1867
Lambert's Factory, Nottingham
St Mary's Church, Clifton
All Saints' Church, Strelley 1868

References

English clockmakers
People from Nottingham
1790s births
1883 deaths
People from South Derbyshire District